Leporinus venerei is a species of anostomid fish. It is endemic to Brazil and known only from the Araguaia River basin. This species can reach a length of  SL.

Etymology
It is named in honor of Paulo Cesare Venere of the Universidade Federal de Mato Grosso, Campus Universitário do Araguaia. It was he who collected the first known specimens of this species in 1995.

References

Anostomidae
Freshwater fish of Brazil
Endemic fauna of Brazil
Taxa named by Heraldo Antonio Britski
Taxa named by José Luis Olivan Birindelli
Fish described in 2008